HMS Lookout  was an L-class destroyer of the Royal Navy. She was launched on 4 November 1940 and broken up in 1948. She was one of only two L-class destroyers to survive the Second World War, the other being .

Ordered under the 1937 Programme, Scotts Shipbuilding and Engineering Company were awarded the contract to build her. She would be the second Royal Navy ship to bear the name Lookout. Build was completed on 30 January 1942 and the tender cost was £440,204 which excluded items such as weapons and communications equipment supplied by the Admiralty.

After a successful Warship Week National Savings campaign in January 1942, HMS Lookout was adopted by the civil community of Burnley, Lancashire.

Operational history

Sea Trials

Lookouts sea trials were generally satisfactory, but were rather protracted through no fault of the ship. On 18 January 1942 Lookout underwent her gunnery trials which were entirely satisfactory. Gun mountings 'B' and 'X' lost two cartridge cases overboard when firing abeam, but this did not affect the outcome of the trial. The next day Lookout carried out her preliminary full power trial at a mean displacement of 2,320 tons. Her first attempt at a four-hour full-power trial was carried out on 21 January 1942 but was abandoned due to bad weather conditions. Her next attempt at the trial was a success. On 20 January Lookout finally carried out the trial in a Force 6 wind.

Arctic Convoys

Lookout was with the Home Fleet in March 1942 when the German battleship  made ineffective attempts to intercept Arctic convoys (Operation Sportpalast). The battle squadron sailed to cover against any move by Tirpitz to intercept Russian convoys QP8 and PQ12. Tirpitz was out at sea during this time but failed to locate the convoys due to bad weather conditions.

Operation Ironclad

Lookout participated in the allied occupation of Madagascar. On 7 May the three L-class destroyers escorted the battleship  to search for an enemy battleship and cruisers. None were found, but Laforey sank an enemy submarine.

Operation Pedestal

In August 1942, Lookout was escorting the aircraft carrier  when Eagle was torpedoed on 11 August and sunk. The next day Lookout joined  in an attack on an enemy submarine which they had sighted on the surface, but no kill was made. Lookout was then detached with Charybdis,  and Lightning to assist the aircraft carrier  after she had been hit by dive bombers.

Shortly after Operation Pedestal, Lt.Cdr. Cecil Powis Frobisher Brown relinquished command of Lookout and was relieved by Lt.Cdr. Archibald George Forman. He was later promoted to commander while in command of Lookout.

Lookout went to action stations but the vessel was found to have been abandoned and so a skeleton crew was put on board to examine her. Eventually the stokers managed to raise steam on her and Lookout escorted Luarana to Gibraltar.

Having spent much of August and most of September 1942 operating out of Gibraltar, Lookout returned home as escort to the battleship , departing from Gibraltar on 30 September and arriving on the Clyde on 5 October before departing the next day for Rosyth where she arrived on 8 October. She then sailed north to Scapa Flow, arriving there on 9 October.

Lookout then left Scapa Flow on 23 October for Gibraltar as part escort to battleship , arriving on 29 October at which time she rejoined the 19th Destroyer Flotilla.

Operation Retribution

On their way up the swept channel they were bombed by Ju 88s, but suffered no damage. The boarding party later reported that everything was as it should be and the Italian ship was released.

On 13 May Lookout sighted a small boat 10 miles north-east of Plane Island. Thirteen Germans and one Italian were captured. On 22 May Lookout made radar contact with Italian auxiliary transport Stella Maris. Lookout fired 24 rounds of 4.7 inch and along with Laforey, successfully sank the Italian vessel. Lookout then covered Laforey as she picked up survivors.

Operation Corkscrew

On 8 and 9 June Lookout was involved in Operation Corkscrew. It was during this operation that Lookout achieved the distinction of probably being the most heavily bombed destroyer to survive the war. The 19 Destroyer Flotilla, which included Lookout, bombarded a shore position. But soon white flags could be seen hanging out of windows and troops eventually landed with no resistance.

As dusk approached, the other ships withdrew leaving Lookout patrolling the island as guard ship. When the other ships were about 10 miles away, the Luftwaffe appeared expecting to find an invasion fleet, but only found the destroyer Lookout. Lookout went to action stations and put up an anti aircraft barrage and took violent evasive action. By this time however her gunnery was impaired by the failing light. Despite many close misses from bombs, Lookout remained undamaged and after the bombers had moved on, Lookout continued to patrol.

Lookout supported the allied landings at Salerno (Operation Avalanche) in September 1943, shelling German gun positions in support of 56 Division. A few days later she was nearly hit by a glider bomb but sustained little damage and was able to continue bombardments in support of the army until 15 September, when she sailed back to Malta for repairs.

Late war service

After a major refit beginning on 13 November 1943, Lookout returned to service on 23 July 1944 under the command of Lt.Cdr. Derick Hetherington. She was assigned to the 14 Destroyer Flotilla. On 12 October Loyal was severely damaged by a mine. Lookout towed her home.

At the beginning of 1945, Lookout was transferred to the 3 Destroyer Flotilla. On 15 January she bombarded targets in San Remo. On the 18 and 19 she bombarded targets near the Franco-Italian border.

Lookout remained on bombardment and escort duties of the west coast of Italy until Victory Europe day.

Reserve status and Demolition

Lookout took passage from Gibraltar to Plymouth on 19 October 1945 to be paid off and reduced to Reserve status. The ship was laid up in Reserve at Devonport and in October 1947 placed on the Disposal List. Sold to BISCO in January 1948, she was taken in tow to Newport, Monmouthshire for demolition by John Cashmore and arrived at the breaker's yard on 29 February that year.

Burnley Sea Cadets lounge is named the Lookout Lounge in memory of the ship and her crew. The Greenock Museum in Scotland has a model of Lookout (G32).

Notes

References

External links
 
 uboat.net Profile of HMS Lookout (G32)
 

 

L and M-class destroyers of the Royal Navy
Ships built on the River Clyde
1940 ships
World War II destroyers of the United Kingdom